Reservoir Woods Park is a public park in Roseville, Minnesota, United States.  The largely undeveloped  property contains some of the highest ground in the city and two dog parks.

The site of the park contains a 30 million-gallon aboveground reservoir that was built and operated by the City of Saint Paul.  The land was sold to the City of Roseville in 1997, after the old 90 million-gallon reservoir built in 1918 became outdated and was taken out of service.

When Roseville created Reservoir Woods Park, the land was intentionally left in a very forest-like state.  Very little development has been done other than building a paved trail through the park and maintaining various natural-surface trails.  The park's paved trail connects to the McCarrons Lake paths and Trout Brook Regional Trail to the east, sidepaths along Roselawn Avenue and Lexington Avenue to the west, a sidepath along Dale Street to the north, and the parking area off Larpenteur Avenue to the south.

References

External links
Reservoir Woods Park

1997 establishments in Minnesota
Protected areas established in 1997
Protected areas of Ramsey County, Minnesota
Regional parks in Minnesota
Roseville, Minnesota